This is a list of television programs broadcast by Fox in Italy.

Comedy 

 'Til Death
 According to Jim
 The Fresh Prince of Bel-Air
 Friends
 Glee
 How I Met Your Mother
 Less Than Perfect
 Lincoln Heights
 New Girl
 The Office
 Sabrina, the Teenage Witch
 Scrubs

Drama 

 24
 24: Legacy
 24: Live Another Day
 7th Heaven
 90210
 Burn Notice
 Dexter
 Dirty Sexy Money
 Friday Night Lights
 Greek
 Genius
 House The Hot Zone
 Last Resort
 Lie to Me
 The Listener
 Lost
 Mental
 The O.C.
 October Road
 Party of Five
 Prison Break
 Runaway
 The Secret Life of the American Teenager
 South of Nowhere
 Veronica Mars
 The Walking Dead
 The West Wing

Sci-fi 

 The 4400
 Angel
 Battlestar Galactica
 Buffy the Vampire Slayer
 Charmed
 The Dead Zone
 Dollhouse
 The Dresden Files
 Eureka
 Falling Skies
 FlashForward
 The Gates
 Harper's Island
 Kyle XY
 No Ordinary Family
 Reaper
 Roswell
 Sleepy Hollow
 Smallville
 Stargate Atlantis
 Stargate SG-1
 Supernatural
 Teen Wolf
 Terra Nova
 Tru Calling
 True Blood
 The X-Files

Animation 

 American Dad!
 Bob's Burgers
 The Cleveland Show
 Clone High
 Family Guy
 Futurama
 King of the Hill
 The Simpsons

Fox (Italy)